Trzciniec  is a village in the administrative district of Gmina Czaplinek, within Drawsko County, West Pomeranian Voivodeship, in north-western Poland.

A historic palace and park are located in the village.

Before 1945 the village was German-settled and part of Prussia and Germany.

Gallery

References

Trzciniec